is a Japanese manga written and illustrated by Kozue Takeuchi. In 2013, it was adapted as an anime special that was shown at Ribon Festa. The manga ended on September 1, 2017.

Plot

Chocotan is about a puppy named Chocotan and her owner. Chocotan is able to talk to her owner due to her eating a plant that gave her the ability to speak. Nao, her owner, has a crush on someone that she goes and sees every day at the park to walk their dogs.

Characters

Main characters
Chocotan
Voiced by: Rie Kugimiya
Nao Hatori
Voiced by: Ayane Sakura

References

External links
 
 

J.C.Staff
Manga series
Romance anime and manga
2011 manga
Shōjo manga
Shueisha franchises
Shueisha manga